Elizabeth Ranken is a British choreographer, performer, director, movement director and artist. She is an Associate Artist of the Royal Shakespeare Company (RSC) and was a lead performer with DV8 Physical Theatre. Her work encompasses opera, theatre, physical theatre, dance, television, film and art.

Early years 
Ranken initially read biology and holds a BSc from London University. She later qualified as a speech therapist from Central School of Speech and Drama before moving to Laban Dance Centre to train in choreography and performance.

Career 
On leaving Laban Dance Centre, Ranken was invited by Jacob Marley to set up Company of Cracks, which was a cross over between dance and performance art. In the early '80s, Ranken met Angus Farquhar and became a member of the industrial music group Test Dept.

In 1986, Ranken was invited by Lloyd Newson to join DV8 Physical Theatre as a deviser and performer. She became an Artist in Residence at the Centre for Contemporary Arts (CCA, Glasgow) creating her own work.

In 1992 Ranken began a collaboration with Shared Experience, working with Helen Edmundson and becoming an Associate Artist for the company. In 1993 Ranken won the Edinburgh Evening News Capital Award for directing, devising and performing 'Funk Off Green' at the Edinburgh Fringe.

Ranken was invited by Michael Attenborough to work as Movement Director at the RSC, ultimately becoming an Associate Artist with the company. She has an ongoing association with Michael Boyd, who later became Artistic Director at the Royal Shakespeare Company.

Ranken began painting in 2011 with a painting of Michael Boyd, which is currently in the collection at the RSC.

In 2015, she made her debut as a choreographer in opera with L'Orfeo for the Royal Opera House.

Theatre 
Credits as Movement Director:

Physical Theatre and Dance 
Credits:

Opera 
Credits as Choreographer and Movement Director:

Film work 
Ranken has appeared in the following films:
1990  Silences
1991 Caught Looking directed by Constantine Giannaris
1991 Edward II directed by Derek Jarman
1993 Three Steps to Heaven directed by Constantine Giannaris'
1994 Touched directed by Wendy Houstoun

Ranken was the choreographer for:
1997 The film Alive and Kicking directed by Nancy Meckler. This film is also known as Indian Summer
2000 3 Steps to Heaven, directed by Constantine Giannaris

Awards 
1988 Ranken won The Place portfolio choreographic award with composer John Eacott. This was for artists to watch out for and invest in. Matthew Bourne also won this award in the same year.
1992 She won The Time Out Award for choreographing Anna Karenina for Shared Experience theatre company.
1993 Ranken won the Edinburgh Evening News Capital Award for directing, devising and performing 'Funk Off Green' at the Edinburgh Fringe

Paintings 

2011: Ranken's portrait of Michael Boyd was taken into the Royal Shakespeare Company Portrait collection.

2013: Ranken's painting of James Rowsell, Louise Bangay and their daughter Isadora entitled Diamond Values was taken into the Heinz Archive at the National Portrait Gallery.

2013: Ranken's painting, entitled Held in Infinity, was taken into the Heinz Archive and Library at The National Portrait Gallery.

Other 
1986: Ranken began performing with the band Test Department. At this time, she had started to collaborate with Test Department's percussionist Angus Farquhar while she was at the Laban. He was at Goldsmiths studying drama and they shared the same campus. In 1998 Ranken collaborated with Angus Farquhar and his new company NVA performing at the National Day for Britain at the World EXPO in Lisbon. They created a pagan fire festival with musicians and dancers from Scotland and Portugal, burning 15-meter high straw figures (gigantones) in front of a live audience of 10,000. 
1992: She was performer/choreographer for The Big Tease working with strippers for the Edinburgh Fringe festival. Ranken performed alongside the strippers whose autobiographies were the basis of the show.
1995: She was the performer/devisor of Doing Bird directed by Irvine Allan for Glasgow Mayfest, then touring prisons in Scotland including Barlinnie Prison. The piece then was performed at the West Yorkshire Playhouse, and toured prisons in Leeds including Armley Jail.

References

External links 
 
Interview with Liz Ranken: 
Elizabeth Ranken at Saatchi Art 

British painters
Living people
Contemporary dance choreographers
British portrait painters
English choreographers
Year of birth missing (living people)